The athletics competition in the 2009 Asian Youth Games were held at the Bishan Stadium in Singapore between 30 June and 3 July 2009. Each country is limited to having 6 boys and 6 girls for the entire competition.

Medalists

Boys

Girls

Medal table

Results

Boys

100 m

Round 1
30 June

Final
3 July

400 m

Round 1
30 June

Final
2 July

800 m

Round 1
1 July

Final
3 July

1500 m

30 June

110 m hurdles

Round 1
1 July

Final
2 July

400 m hurdles

2 July

4 × 200 m relay

Round 1
1 July

Final
3 July

High jump

3 July

Pole vault

30 June

Long jump

2 July

Triple jump

3 July

Shot put

3 July

Discus throw

30 June

Javelin throw

2 July

Girls

100 m

Round 1
30 June

Final
3 July

400 m

Round 1
30 June

Final
2 July

800 m

Round 1
1 July

Final
3 July

1500 m

30 June

100 m hurdles

Round 1 
1 July

Final
2 July

400 m hurdles

2 July

4 × 200 m relay

3 July

High jump

30 June

Pole vault

1 July

Long jump

30 June

Triple jump

1 July

Shot put

1 July

Discus throw

2 July

Javelin throw

3 July

References

Results

External links
 Official website
 Asian Youth Games report from IAAF

Athletics
Asian Youth Games
2009 Asian Youth Games
2009